Yngve Hilmer Casslind (28 June 1932 – 17 September 1992) was a Swedish ice hockey player. He competed in the men's tournament at the 1956 Winter Olympics.

References

External links
 

1932 births
1992 deaths
Ice hockey players at the 1956 Winter Olympics
Olympic ice hockey players of Sweden
Ice hockey people from Stockholm